Malinga Surappulige (born 8 August 1983) is a Sri Lankan cricketer. He played 63 first-class and 50 List A matches for multiple domestic sides in Sri Lanka between 2001 and 2013. He made his Twenty20 debut on 17 August 2004, for Panadura Sports Club in the 2004 SLC Twenty20 Tournament. His last first-class match was for Chilaw Marians Cricket Club in the 2012–13 Premier Trophy on 8 March 2013.

See also
 List of Chilaw Marians Cricket Club players

References

External links
 

1983 births
Living people
Sri Lankan cricketers
Badureliya Sports Club cricketers
Chilaw Marians Cricket Club cricketers
Panadura Sports Club cricketers
Ragama Cricket Club cricketers
Saracens Sports Club cricketers
Tamil Union Cricket and Athletic Club cricketers
Place of birth missing (living people)